Lucky Blue Smith (born June 4, 1998) is an American fashion model, actor and musician. He was scouted at the age of 10 and signed to an international modeling agency by the age of 12.

Modeling career
Smith grew up in the small city of Spanish Fork, Utah. He is the youngest of four siblings and the only male. Smith was scouted with his three sisters in Utah when he was 10 and began his modeling career when he was 12. Upon being signed with Next Management, he and the entire Smith family moved to Los Angeles where the younger children were homeschooled. Shortly after their arrival, Smith and his siblings were photographed by Hedi Slimane for Vogue Homme Japan which generated immediate attention.

Smith's modeling career especially took off after he dyed his hair platinum blond at his agent's advice, which became his signature look for some time. By 2015, he had shot a dozen magazine covers and fronted fashion campaigns for Philipp Plein and Tom Ford. He and several other models appeared in Tom Ford's fashion video with Lady Gaga for SS16.

He has appeared in editorials for American, French, Spanish, and Ukrainian Vogue, GQ, British Elle, Marie Claire, V, Numéro, i-D, LOVE, and W.
Smith has appeared on the covers of French and Spanish Vogue, GQ, V, and Harper's Bazaar.

Smith has walked the runways for Fendi, Chanel, Roberto Cavalli, Moschino, Emporio Armani, DSquared2, Salvatore Ferragamo, Philipp Plein, Ralph Lauren, Balmain, Tom Ford, Marc Jacobs, Ermanno Scervino, Versace, Jeremy Scott, Michael Kors, John Varvatos, Etro and Bottega Veneta.

He has appeared in advertising campaigns for Tom Ford, Calvin Klein, Moncler, Tommy Hilfiger, Philipp Plein,  Mavi, Penshoppe,  H&M, Gap, Big C and L'Oreal.

Musical career
In 2009, Smith and his three sisters formed a surf-rock band called The Atomics. Smith is the drummer and has stated that music is his real passion. The band is also represented by Next.

Personal life
He was raised in Utah by a family who were members of the Church of Jesus Christ of Latter-day Saints.  Smith's mother, Sheridan Smith, is a former model.  His father, Dallon Smith, is a hobbyist musician who started a guitar-string company. His three older sisters are Cheyenne Starlie Smith (born 1993), Daisy Clementine Smith (born 1996), and Pyper America Smith (born 1997), who are all models and social media personalities. He is a member of The Church of Jesus Christ of Latter-day Saints.

Smith has a daughter named Gravity Blue, born July 26, 2017, with former partner Stormi Henley.

On February 21, 2020, Smith married model Nara Pellman. Smith has two children with Pellman, a daughter named Rumble Honey, born October 7, 2020, and a son named Slim Easy, born January 6, 2022.

Recognition
In 2015, Teen Vogue named Smith the "Model of the Moment". A relative newcomer, he was named to Models.com's "Top 50 Male Models" for 2015 and had the second highest number of social media followers of all male models in the industry. Many in the fashion industry acknowledge that Smith's popularity (especially among teenage girls and boys) on social media is a deciding factor for brands and editors who have hired him.

Filmography

Film

Media appearances
 2015 The Ellen DeGeneres Show
 2016 Project Runway, Season 15 Episode 4 "Sink Or Swim", guest judge.
 2016 Studio C, Season 7 Episode 4, special guest star

References

External links
 
 Interview at Models.com
 Cover Vanity Teen Girl!

1998 births
Living people
People from Spanish Fork, Utah
Male models from Utah
Models from Los Angeles
American Latter Day Saints
Male models from California